Nathan Kelsey Hall (March 28, 1810 – March 2, 1874) was a United States representative from New York, the 14th United States Postmaster General and a United States district judge of the United States District Court for the Northern District of New York.

Hall was nominated by President Millard Fillmore on August 13, 1852, to a seat vacated by Alfred Conkling. He was confirmed by the United States Senate on August 31, 1852, and received commission the same day. Hall's service was terminated on March 2, 1874, due to death.

Education and career

Born on March 28, 1810, in Marcellus, Onondaga County, New York, Hall moved to Erie County, New York in his early youth and attended the district schools, and engaged in shoe-making and agricultural pursuits. He read law with future President Millard Fillmore in 1832. He entered private practice in Buffalo, New York from 1832 to 1850. He was clerk for the Board of Supervisors of Erie County from 1832 to 1838. He was city attorney for Buffalo from 1833 to 1834. He was an alderman for Buffalo in 1837. He was a Master in Chancery in Buffalo from 1839 to 1841, on the appointment of Governor of New York William H. Seward. He was a Judge of the Court of Common Pleas for Erie County from January 1841 to January 1845. He was a member of the New York State Assembly in 1846.

Congressional service and Postmaster General

Hall was elected as a Whig from New York's 32nd congressional district to the United States House of Representatives of the 30th United States Congress, serving from March 4, 1847, to March 3, 1849. He was not a candidate for renomination in 1848. Hall served as the 14th Postmaster General of the United States in the cabinet of President Millard Fillmore from July 23, 1850, to August 31, 1852.

Federal judicial service

Hall was nominated by President Millard Fillmore on August 13, 1852, to a seat on the United States District Court for the Northern District of New York vacated by Judge Alfred Conkling. He was confirmed by the United States Senate on August 31, 1852, and received his commission the same day. His service terminated on March 2, 1874, due to his death in Buffalo. He was interred in Forest Lawn Cemetery in Buffalo.

University of Buffalo

Hall was "particularly active in procuring the charter" of the University at Buffalo, which President Fillmore founded.

References

Sources

 
 A biography on Nathan Hall
 
 
 Nathan K. Hall at Find A Grave

1810 births
1874 deaths
United States Postmasters General
Judges of the United States District Court for the Northern District of New York
United States federal judges appointed by Millard Fillmore
19th-century American judges
Politicians from Buffalo, New York
New York (state) lawyers
Burials at Forest Lawn Cemetery (Buffalo)
Fillmore administration cabinet members
Whig Party members of the United States House of Representatives from New York (state)
People from Marcellus, New York
19th-century American politicians
Lawyers from Buffalo, New York